Samuel Percy Barbatundu Doherty (born 29 August 1966) is a Sierra Leonean former weightlifter. He competed in the men's light heavyweight event at the 1988 Summer Olympics.

References

External links
 

1966 births
Living people
Sierra Leonean male weightlifters
Olympic weightlifters of Sierra Leone
Weightlifters at the 1988 Summer Olympics
Place of birth missing (living people)
20th-century Sierra Leonean people
21st-century Sierra Leonean people